Mohammed Al Mashaykhi (born 7 March 1991) is an Omani para-athlete who specializes in throwing events. At the 2020 Summer Paralympics, Al Mashaykhi won a bronze medal in the shot put F32 event. This made him the first Omani to win a medal at the Paralympics. He also won a silver medal at the 2017 World Para Athletics Championships in the same category.

References

1991 births
Living people
Male club throwers
Omani male shot putters
Paralympic athletes of Oman
Medalists at the World Para Athletics Championships
Medalists at the 2020 Summer Paralympics
Paralympic bronze medalists for Oman
Paralympic medalists in athletics (track and field)
Athletes (track and field) at the 2016 Summer Paralympics
Athletes (track and field) at the 2020 Summer Paralympics